The plain bush-hen (Amaurornis olivacea) is a species of bird in the family Rallidae.  It is endemic to the Philippines.

References

plain bush-hen
Endemic birds of the Philippines
plain bush-hen
Taxonomy articles created by Polbot